The Chinese Elm cultivar Ulmus parvifolia 'Jade Empress' is an American selection.

Description
'Jade Empress' grows to a height of 10–16 m. The foliage is dark green in summer, turning yellow in autumn .

Pests and diseases
The species and its cultivars are highly resistant, but not immune, to Dutch elm disease, and unaffected by the Elm Leaf Beetle Xanthogaleruca luteola.

Cultivation
'Jade Empress' is not known to be in cultivation beyond North America.

Accessions
None known.

References

Chinese elm cultivar
Ulmus articles missing images
Ulmus